The 2020 Montana gubernatorial election was held on November 3, 2020, to elect the next governor of Montana, concurrently with the U.S. presidential election, as well as elections to the U.S. Senate and the House of Representatives and various state and local elections. It resulted in voters selecting Greg Gianforte over Mike Cooney. Incumbent Democratic Governor Steve Bullock, who was term-limited and could not seek reelection to a third consecutive term in office, was instead seeking Montana's Class II Senate seat.

Bullock's lieutenant governor, Mike Cooney, was the Democratic nominee, while the Republican nominee was Montana's at-large congressman Greg Gianforte. Gianforte won the election, making him the first Republican governor of Montana since Judy Martz.

Democratic primary

Candidates

Nominee
Mike Cooney, Lieutenant Governor of Montana and former Secretary of State of Montana and candidate in 2000
 Running mate: Casey Schreiner, Minority Leader of the Montana House of Representatives

Eliminated in primary
Whitney Williams, businesswoman and daughter of former U.S. Representative Pat Williams
 Running mate: Buzz Mattelin, farmer and president of the National Barley Growers Association

Withdrawn
Reilly Neill, former state representative
Casey Schreiner, Minority Leader of the Montana House of Representatives (running for Lieutenant Governor)

Declined
Ryan Busse, businessman
Wilmot Collins, Mayor of Helena and former 2020 candidate for the U.S. Senate
John Heenan, attorney and candidate for Montana's at-large congressional district in 2018
Michael Punke, writer and former U.S. Ambassador to the World Trade Organization
Brian Schweitzer, former Governor of Montana (endorsed Williams)
Kathleen Williams, former state representative and nominee for Montana's at-large congressional district in 2018 (running for the U.S. House)

Endorsements

Polling
Polls with a sample size of <100 have their sample size entries marked in red to indicate a lack of reliability.

Results

Republican primary

Candidates

Nominee

Greg Gianforte, incumbent U.S. Representative for Montana's at-large congressional district and nominee for Governor of Montana in 2016

Running mate: Kristen Juras, businesswoman and attorney

Eliminated in primary
Tim Fox, Attorney General of Montana
Running mate: Jon Knokey, former state representative
Albert Olszewski, state senator and candidate for U.S. Senate in 2018
Running mate: Kenneth Bogner, state senator

Withdrawn
Corey Stapleton, Secretary of State of Montana, candidate for Governor of Montana in 2012 and candidate for the U.S. House in 2014 (running for the U.S. House)
Gary Perry, former state senator
Pete Ziehli

Declined
Matt Rosendale, Montana State Auditor and nominee for the U.S. Senate in 2018 (running for the U.S. House)
Ryan Zinke, former United States Secretary of Interior and former U.S. Representative for Montana's at-large congressional district

Endorsements

Polling
Polls with a sample size of <100 have their sample size entries marked in red to indicate a lack of reliability.

Results

Other candidates

Libertarian Party

Nominee
Lyman Bishop, founder and CEO of Hoplite Armor
Running mate: John Nesper

Withdrawn
Ron Vandevender, nominee for lieutenant governor in 2016 and nominee for governor in 2012

Green Party

Disqualified
Robert Barb
Running mate: Joshua Thomas

Results

General election

Debate

Predictions

Endorsements

Polling

with Mike Cooney, Tim Fox, Greg Gianforte, Albert Olszewski, Ron Vandevender and Whitney Williams

with Mike Cooney, Tim Fox, Greg Gianforte, Reilly Neill, Albert Olszewski, Gary Perry, Casey Schreiner and Whitney Williams

with Tim Fox, Matt Rosendale, Corey Stapleton, Kathleen Williams and Whitney Williams

Results

Results by County

Notes

Partisan clients

References

External links
Official campaign websites
 Lyman Bishop (L) for Governor
 Mike Cooney (D) for Governor
 Greg Gianforte (R) for Governor

2020
Governor
Montana